Arlene Rush is a New York City-based multidisciplinary artist. Initially, she created abstract metal sculptures, with her practice evolving to incorporate more conceptual work. Her current work addresses themes of gender, identity, socioeconomics, and politics, examining issues that impact the contemporary world.

Biography

Rush grew up in the Parkchester section of The Bronx. She has a twin brother. As a child, Rush's creativity was encouraged by her parents. She began studying sculpture in High School, and continued her artistic education at Queens College where she received a Bachelor of Arts in 1978, with a strong focus in sculpture. Her career began in the Chelsea district of Manhattan. Her early welded steel abstract sculptures were influenced by Anthony Caro. In 1991, Rush’s practice was stirred by Buddhism, which led to an incorporation of philosophical ideas in her artwork. Since 2005, she has practiced the modern New Kadampa Buddhist tradition.

Rush has previously worked in the architectural and design furnishing industry doing sales, design, project management, and architectural restoration. She has taught art to women with cancer through The Creative Center, a New York based nonprofit organization that brings creative arts to people with cancer and chronic illnesses. As of 2022 Rush sits on The Creative Center's Advisory Council.

Artwork 
In 1997, Rush developed a series of works commenting on gender roles and societal norms.  

As Rush began archiving her career in 2015, she started making work addressing the effects of the art market, gentrification, class warfare, gender bias, and other kinds of discrimination. This is portrayed in her series Evidence of Being (2014–present), which questions what constitutes success and what she describes as the importance and nature of being an artist working in the face of bias. A participatory element of Evidence of Being took place at a phone booth on 14th Street and 7th Avenue during Art in Odd Places''' 2019 festival: INVISIBLE. For the public art event, Rush created an installation using rejection letters from her career and from an open call on social media inviting people to bring their own rejection letters. 

Throughout the COVID-19 pandemic she created masks (resembling the PPE worn to mitigate the virus) with imagery honoring Harriet Tubman, Ruth Bader Ginsburg, and the Black Lives Matter movement. In 2021, Rush started to develop NFTs that reflect her longstanding themes of social justice and identity. 

 Exhibitions and Awards 
Rush has exhibited her work in galleries and museums throughout the United States, Europe, and Asia. She supports gender, health, and social issues, through participating in Visual AIDS’ "Postcards from the Edge" annually since 1998.

The Center for Emerging Visual Artists granted Rush a residency in Barcelona, Spain in 1988. In 2011, she was awarded the Pat Hearn & Colin De Land Foundation Grant.

In 2020, Rush was exhibited in Silvermine Art Center's 70th A•ONE, curated by Barbara O'Brien, and was awarded the Carole Eisner Award For Sculpture.

Rush's first minted NFT, I’m Still Here, was exhibited at the Every Woman Biennial'' on June 24, 2021.

Collections 
Rush is in numerous public and private collections including Mount Sinai Cancer Center; Pavel Zoubok, Pavel Zoubok Gallery, New York, NY; MOMA, Wales, UK; MUBE, São Paulo, Brazil; Mark Golden, GOLDEN Artist Paint, Berlin, NY; Robert H. Chaney, Houston, TX; ARCO Chemical, Newton Square, PA; The Center for Emerging Visual Artists, Philadelphia, PA; Library of Congress, Great Hall, Thomas Jefferson Bldg., Washington, DC; Schomburg Center for Research in Black Culture, New York, NY; Sara M. Vance Waddell Collection , Cincinnati, OH; Joe Baio Collection , New York, NY

References

External links 
 Official Website of Arlene Rush
 Arlen Rush pushes artistic boundaries, Interview

1955 births
Living people
20th-century American women artists
21st-century American women artists
American installation artists
American multimedia artists
Artists from New York (state)
People from the Bronx
Queens College, City University of New York alumni